4 was the number assigned to two distinct streetcar lines operated by the Los Angeles Railway in Los Angeles, California.

History

1931 alignment

4 was first assigned to a short turn service of the 3 Line. This operated from 1931 to 1935 when all operations along the route reverted to 3 Line service.

1939 alignment
The number was later assigned to the Boyle Street Shuttle (previously line 31) beginning May 19, 1939. This service was short lived and ceased in October 1941.

Sources

External links
 4 Line Archives — Pacific Electric Railway Historical Society
 

Los Angeles Railway routes
Railway services introduced in 1912
1912 establishments in California
1937 disestablishments in California